Milan Barjaktarevic (born 12 June 1987) is a Swedish footballer who played for Kalmar FF as a goalkeeper.

He was previously attached to the youth sections of both Hammarby and Heart of Midlothian, but did not make a first team appearance for either. He joined Kalmar in December 2006.

References

External links
Kalmar FF Profile
Profile at londonhearts.com

Eliteprospects Football profile

1987 births
Living people
Footballers from Stockholm
Swedish people of Serbian descent
Association football goalkeepers
Swedish footballers
Swedish expatriate footballers
Expatriate footballers in Scotland
Swedish expatriate sportspeople in the United Kingdom
Hammarby Fotboll players
Heart of Midlothian F.C. players
Kalmar FF players
IK Sirius Fotboll players
Serb diaspora sportspeople